Naatak is a Bollywood film. It was released in 1947. It has been released for free on YouTube. This film is known to be one of the earliest Indian film to be partly couloured.

Music
"Dil Wale Jal Jal Kar Hi Mar Jaana" - Uma Devi
"Dil Leke Chale To Nahi Jaaoge" - Suraiya
"Na Ho Koi Jaha Chale Hum Tum Waha" - Amar, Suraiya
"Apna Jinhe Banaya Thukra Ke Wo Sidhare" - Suraiya
"Bhul Ja Ae Dil Wo" - Amar
"Jab Se Chale Gaye Hai Wo" - Suraiya
"Kale Kale Aaye Badarva" - Suraiya
"Kya Bataye Kitni Hasrat Dil Ke Virane Me Hai" - Zohrabai Ambalewali
"Man Ka Panchhi Shor Machaaye" - Amar
"Taro Bhari Raat Sajan" - Suraiya

References

External links
 

1947 films
1940s Hindi-language films
Films scored by Naushad
Indian drama films
1947 drama films
Hindi-language drama films